Paul of Burgos (Burgos,  1351 – 29 August 1435) was a Spanish Jew who converted to Christianity, and became an archbishop, Lord Chancellor, and exegete. He is known also as Pablo de Santa Maria, Paul de Santa Maria, and  Paulus episcopus Burgensis. His original name was Solomon ha-Levi.

Early life
He was the most wealthy and influential Jew of Burgos, an erudite scholar of Talmudic and rabbinical literature, and a rabbi of the Jewish community. His father, Isaac ha-Levi, had come from Aragon to Burgos in the middle of the fourteenth century. Solomon ha-Levi also apparently filled the office of tax-farmer at the same time.

According to Graetz, his scholarship and intelligence, no less than his piety, won the praise of Isaac ben Sheshet, with whom he carried on a learned correspondence.  This assertion is disputed by Atlas and Hershman as anachronistic; "...the disparity in age between Paul de Burgos and Perfet renders the assumption of Graetz untenable."

Conversion
He received Christian baptism on 21 July 1391 at Burgos, taking the name Paul de Santa María. French historian Leon Poliakov writes that he converted in the aftermath of the great massacres of Jews which began on 6 June 1391.  He himself said that he had been convinced by the works of Thomas Aquinas. The official Catholic Church records show that he had converted to Christianity a year earlier (at 21 July 1390), but studies attribute this record forgery to Paul himself, who wanted to show that it wasn't the pressure of the massacre that instigated his baptism. At the same time his brothers Pedro Suárez and Alvar García, his sister María Nuñez, and his children, one daughter and four sons, aged from three to twelve years, were baptized. His wife, Joanna, whom he had married in his twenty-sixth year, remained faithful to Judaism, dying in that faith in 1420; she was afterward buried in the Church of S. Pablo, built by her husband.

Controversy

Following his conversion, Paul, like fellow convert Joshua ha-Lorki (Gerónimo de Santa Fe) took an active role in persecuting Spanish Jews. Kenneth Levin has stated that when a wave of forced conversions of Jews to Christianity began in 1411, Paul "took a leading role in the assault on Spain’s remaining Jews and was responsible for drawing up edicts that isolated the Jews, stripped them of many communal rights, and, most importantly, deprived them of almost all means of earning a living, leaving them with the choice of death by privation for themselves and their families or conversion." Jewish historians have strongly suggested that Paul converted for social and economic (as opposed to religious) reasons following a wave of anti-Jewish violence and forced conversions throughout Spain in 1391.

Later life
Paul spent some years at the University of Paris, receiving the degree of doctor of theology after several years. He then visited London, where he probably remained only a short time, sending a Hebrew satire on Purim to Don Meïr Alguades from that city.

He was appointed archdeacon of Treviño, and in 1402 (or 1405) became Bishop of Cartagena; and in 1415, Archbishop of Burgos. He was succeeded in the see of Burgos by his second son, Archbishop Alfonso of Burgos.

His intelligence and scholarship, as well as his gift of oratory, gained for him the confidence of King Henry III of Castile, who in 1406 appointed him keeper of the royal seal, in succession to Pero Lopez de Ayala. In 1416 King Henry named him Lord Chancellor. After the king's death Archbishop Paul was a member of the council which ruled Castile in the name of the regent Doña Catalina, and by the will of the deceased king he was tutor to the heir to the throne, the later John II of Castile.

Relationship to Judaism
Paul, who even after he had been baptized continued to correspond with several Jews, including Joseph Orabuena, chief rabbi of Navarre, and Joshua ibn Vives, became a bitter enemy of Judaism. He tried his best, frequently with success, to convert his former coreligionists.

In the same spirit the chief object of the edict which he drafted as chancellor of the kingdom, and which was promulgated in the name of the regent, the widowed queen mother Catherine of Lancaster, at Valladolid on January 2 (not 12), 1412, was the conversion of the Jews. This law, which consisted of twenty-four articles, was designed to separate the Jews entirely from the Christians, to paralyze their commerce, to humiliate them, and to expose them to contempt, requiring them either to live within the close quarters of their ghetto or to accept baptism.

Impelled by his hatred of Talmudic Judaism, Paul in the year preceding his death composed the Dialogus Pauli et Sauli Contra Judæos, sive Scrutinium Scripturarum (Mantua, 1475; Mayence, 1478; Paris, 1507, 1535; Burgos, 1591), which subsequently served as a source for Alfonso de Spina, Geronimo de Santa Fé, and other Spanish writers hostile to the Jews, and Martin Luther in Germany for his treatise On the Jews and their Lies. A few years after his baptism he wrote Additiones (which consist of addenda to Nicholas of Lyra's postils on the Bible, and have been frequently printed), and in his old age a Historia Universal in Spanish verse.

Works
The published writings of Archbishop Paul were:
Dialogus Pauli et Sauli contra Judæos, sive Scrutinium scripturarum (Mantua, 1475; Mains, 1478; Paris, 1507, 1535; Burgos, 1591).
Additiones to the Postilla of Nicholas of Lyra (Nuremberg, 1481; 1485; 1487, etc.; Venice, 1481, 1482, etc.).
It is chiefly on the latter work that Paul's reputation as an exegete rests. The Additiones were originally mere marginal notes written in a volume of the Postilla which he sent to his son Alfonso. Their publication aroused Matthias Döring, the provincial of the Saxon Franciscans, to publish his Replicæ, a bitter rejection of almost half of the 1,100 suggestions and additions Paul had made.
 De nomine divino quæstiones duodecim (Utrecht, 1707).
These tracts are excerpts from the Additiones in regard to Exodus iii, and are joined to the scholia of J. Drusius on the correct pronunciation of the name of Jahweh.

See also 

 Alfonso de Cartagena
 Álvar García de Santa María
 Gonzalo de Santa María
 Teresa de Cartagena
 Francisco de Vitoria
 Isabel Osorio

External links

Scrutinium Dialogus Pauli et Sauli contra Judæos, sive Scrutinium scripturarum. Burgos. 1591.

References

Sanctotis, Vita d. Pauli episcopi Burgensis; pp. 32, 40 et seq.;
Mariana, Historia general de España, IV (Barcelona, 1839), 324;
Antonio, Biblioth. hispan. vetus, II (Madrid, 1788), 237.
Alonso Fernandez, Historia de Plasencia, p. 94;
Rios, Estudios, pp. 338 et seq.;
Rios, Hist. ii.291 et seq., 493 et seq.;
I. da Costa, Israel und die Völker, German transl., pp. 223 et seq.;
Moritz Steinschneider, Cat. Bodl. p. 2087;
Meyer Kayserling, Sephardim, pp. 64 et seq.;
Heinrich Graetz, Geschichte, viii.84 et seq.
His epitaph is given in Florez, España Sagrada, xxvi.387, and Kayserling, l.c. p. 333.

1351 births
1435 deaths
14th-century Castilian rabbis
15th-century Roman Catholic archbishops in Castile
Archbishops of Burgos
Bishops of Cartagena
Christian anti-Judaism in the Middle Ages
Conversos
Converts to Roman Catholicism from Judaism
People from Burgos